Johnny Sims (born October 14, 1967) is a former American football lineman who played one season with the New Orleans Night of the Arena Football League. He played college football at Mississippi Valley State University.

References

External links
Just Sports Stats

Living people
1967 births
Players of American football from Mississippi
American football offensive linemen
American football defensive linemen
African-American players of American football
Mississippi Valley State Delta Devils football players
New Orleans Night players
People from Columbia, Mississippi
21st-century African-American people
20th-century African-American sportspeople